Koen Creek is a stream in St. Francois County in the U.S. state of Missouri. It is a tributary of the Flat River.

Koen Creek has the name of the local Koen family.

See also
List of rivers of Missouri

References

Rivers of St. Francois County, Missouri
Rivers of Missouri